Shahidabad Rural District may refer to:

Shahidabad Rural District (Fars Province)
Shahidabad Rural District (Mazandaran Province)
Shahidabad Rural District (Qazvin Province)